The National Rally of Chadian Democrats, formerly the National Rally for Democracy in Chad, is a democratic socialist political party in Chad. It is considered a semi-opposition party that was allied with the ruling Patriotic Salvation Movement (MPS) during the rule of Idriss Déby, and it participated in the government a few times during that time.

In the parliamentary election held on 21 April 2002, the party won one out of 155 seats. In the May 2006 presidential election, its candidate, Albert Pahimi Padacké, won 7.82% of the vote.

References

Political parties in Chad